This is a list of episodes for the television series The Paper Chase.

All four seasons of this show have been released on DVD by Shout! Factory.

Series overview

Episodes

Season 1 (1978–79)

Season 2 (1983–84)

Season 3 (1985)

Season 4 (1986)

References

Paper Chase